East India is a station on Docklands Light Railway (DLR) in Leamouth, east London. It takes its name from the nearby former East India Docks of the Port of London, where ships trading with the Indian subcontinent used to dock.

It is on the Beckton and Woolwich Arsenal branches of the DLR, and is in Travelcard Zones 2 and 3. It opened, with the Beckton Branch, on 28 March 1994.

The historic Greenwich Prime Meridian crosses the DLR at the eastern end of the platforms, which is marked by an illuminated blue line underneath the tracks at street level. The modern IERS Reference Meridian used by GPS crosses the tracks approximately 117 metres further east between Neutron Tower and Switch House, but is unmarked.

History 
East India station was originally to be named Brunswick Wharf and this name was shown on the 1994 'all projections' map. 'Brunswick' is now a code destination used to indicate that a train in the depot has been cleaned. In February 2001 an episode of the ITV series The Bill featured DLR trains with 'Brunswick' as a dummy destination for filming purposes.

Connections
London Buses route D3 and night route N550 serve the station.

References

External links

Docklands Light Railway website – East India station page

Docklands Light Railway stations in the London Borough of Tower Hamlets
Railway stations in Great Britain opened in 1994